Jean Bounine-Cabalé (1 September 1923 – 9 March 2007) was a French businessman and consultant. He wrote several economic books.

Life and work
Bounine-Cabalé was born on 1 September 1923 in Djidjelli, Algeria. Son of a director of public school, Jean Bounine-Cabalé attended the Ecole polytechnique, where he graduated in 1948. He was successively an engineer at the Japy Frères (1948–50), Strafor-Maroc (1950–56), an independent consulting engineer (since 1957), advisor to the Chairman of L'Oreal (1960–90), founder (1971) and Chairman of the Supervisory Board of Novaction, Managing Director (1982) and Chairman (1992) of JB Consult and Advisor to the Chairman of Solving International.

Jean Bounine published several books in collaboration with François Dalle, Chairman of L'Oreal and a boss of the Trente Glorieuses (i.e. Post–World War II economic expansion) and François Roche, editor of the French economic newspaper Tribune Desfossés.

Bounine-Cabalé died on 9 March 2007 in Neuilly-sur-Seine.

Awards
He is the Chevalier of the Légion d'Honneur and holder of the Croix de guerre 1939–1945.

Selected publications
L'Entreprise du futur (with François Dalle), Calmann-Lévy, (1971)
Quand l'entreprise s'éveille à la conscience sociale, (avec François Dalle, preface de Jacques Monod), Éditions Laffont, (1975), 
Le Taylorisme à l'envers (avec François Dalle et Bruno Lussato), Institut de l'entreprise, (1977), 
Télématique ou privatique ?, Éditions d'Informatique, (1977), 
Produire juste à temps (avec Kiyoshi Suzaki), (1986), 
Pour développer l'emploi (rapport à Monsieur le Ministre des affaires sociales et de l'emploi), Editions Masson Paris, (1987), 
Un projet pour le textile-habillement français, rapport remis à Roger Fauroux (1989)
L'Éducation en entreprise. Contre le chômage des jeunes, Éditions Odile Jacob, (1993), 
Le Sursaut (avec François Dalle), Calmann-Lévy Paris, (1994),  (lire en ligne)
Vérités sur les 35 heures, Rocher, (2002),

Notes

References

1923 births
2007 deaths
20th-century French businesspeople
École Polytechnique alumni
People from Jijel
French industrial engineers
Chevaliers of the Légion d'honneur
21st-century French engineers
21st-century French businesspeople
20th-century French engineers
Recipients of the Croix de Guerre 1939–1945 (France)
French economics writers
21st-century French male writers
20th-century French male writers
French business executives